The Nederlandse Rugby league Bond Championship, also known as NRLB Championship, is a Semi-Professional competition and the top-tier of branded Rugby League of the Netherlands. It currently consists of five teams. It was formed in 2015. The league consists of Netherlands Internationals, along with foreign players of various nations, including; England, Ireland, New Zealand, Australia, Fiji, Luxembourg and Germany.

Teams

Highlighted team denotes reigning champions

Winners
The NRLB Championship Grand Final has been the championship-deciding game since 2015. The finals are traditionally held by the current trophy holders. Prior to the 2019 season, the Grand Final trophy was renames, Jason Bruygoms Beker, as a thank you to Jason Bruygoms, who resurrected Dutch rugby league in 2015 after the sport was absent in the country for nearly a decade.

Results

The Double
In rugby league, the term 'the Double' is referring to the achievement of a club that wins both the minor premiership and premier final in the same season. To date, this has been achieved by a total two different clubs.

2015 Competition
The 2015 competition was fought out between Amsterdam Cobras, Den Haag Knights, Rotterdam Pitbulls and North Brussels Gorillas (Belgium). The North Brussels Gorillas won the inaugural competition after defeating Den Haag Knights 48-06 in the Grand Final.

Teams

Ladder

League Schedule

Round 1

Round 2

Round 3

Finals

Third-Place Play Off

Grand Final

2016 Competition
In 2016, the North Brussels Gorillas competing in the Belgium League, to help with the development of their countries Rugby League purpose.

On 26 May 2016, Harderwijk Dolphins were registered as an official Rugby League Club and would participate in the Netherlands Rugby League competition in 2017.

Teams

Ladder

League Schedule

Round 1

Round 2

Round 3

Round 4

Round 5

Round 6

Finals

Grand Final
The 2016 Netherland Rugby League Final will take place at Dordrecht Rugby Club on 18 June 2016. The Final will be contested between Rotterdam Pitbulls and Den Haag Knights, both teams qualified by finishing in the Top 2 after all league matches were completed.

End Of Season Awards
To celebrate the 2016 Summer Season and the positive performances from the Netherlands Rugby League International side in Autumn, the end of season awards dinner will be hosted in Utrecht, Netherlands on Friday 17 February 2017.

 Award not open for public vote, winner chosen by the NRLB

2017 Competition

Teams

Ladder

2018 Competition

Teams

Ladder

2019 Competition

Teams

Ladder

2022 Competition

Teams

Ladder

See also

 Netherlands Rugby League Bond
 Netherlands national rugby league team
 List of rugby league competitions

References

External links

Sports leagues in the Netherlands
2007 establishments in the Netherlands
Sports leagues established in 2007
Rugby league in the Netherlands
European rugby league competitions
Professional sports leagues in the Netherlands